The Changkya Khutukhtu (Chakhar Mongolian: Janggiy-a qutuγ-tu, Khalkha Mongolian: Зангиа Хутагт Zangia Khutagt; Tibetan: ལྕང་སྐྱ་ཧོ་ཐོག་ཐུ།, lcang-skya ho-thog-thu; Chinese: 章嘉呼圖克圖, Zhāngjiā Hūtúkètú) was the title held by the spiritual head of the Gelug lineage of Tibetan Buddhism in Inner Mongolia during the Qing dynasty.

The most important lama of this series was the Third Changkya, Rolpai Dorje, who was preceptor to the Qianlong emperor of China, and chief representative of Tibetan Buddhism at the Qing court. He and his successors, mostly based in Beijing, were considered to be the senior Tibetan lamas in China proper and Inner Mongolia. The Seventh Changkya accompanied the Nationalist government to Taiwan in 1949 and died there in 1957.

List of lCang-skya Khutukhtu 
Note: In some enumerations, the second Changkya, Ngawang Losang Chöden is counted as the first, the third Rölpé Dorjé as the second, and so on.

 1607-1641: Changkya Dragpa Öser (lcang skya grags pa 'od zer)
 1642-1714: Changkya Ngawang Losang Chöden (lcang skya ngag dbang bLo bzang chos ldan)
 1717-1786: Changkya Rölpé Dorjé (lcang skya rol pa'i rdo rje), approved by Central Government of China, and Golden Urn was used.
 1787-1846: Changkya Yéshé Tenpé Gyeltsen (lcang skya ye shes bstan pa'i rgyal mtshan)
 1849-1875: Changkya Yéshé Tenpé Nyima (lcang skya ye shes bstan pa'i nyi ma), approved by Central Government of China, and Golden Urn was used.
 1878-1888: Changkya Lozang Tendzin Gyeltsen (lcang skya blo bzang bstan 'dzin rgyal mtshan), approved by Central Government of China, and Golden Urn was used.
 1891-1957: Changkya Lozang Penden Tenpé Drönmé (lcang skya blo bzang dpal ldan bstan pa'i sgron me), approved by Central Government of China, and Golden Urn was used.
 1980- : Changkya Tendzin Dönyö Yéshé Gyatso (bstan 'dzin don yod ye shes rgya mtsho), based on private designation, or based on one person's decision, not approved by Central Government of China.

The previous lCang-skya Khutukhtu, named Lozang Penden Tenpé Drönmé, went to Taiwan in 1949. It has been reported that before his death in 1957 he had signed a pledge that he would not reincarnate until the Republic of China retook the mainland. However, the Dalai Lama recognised the current incarnation on 11 August 1998. He was born in 1980 in Tsongkha region, was ordained at an early age and came to India as a refugee in 1998. He is now residing in the re-established Drepung Monastery, in India. Neither he nor two other claimants to be the current Changkya are recognised by either Taipei or Beijing.

See also 

 Changkya Rölpé Dorjé
 Gönlung Jampa Ling monastery
 Mongolian and Tibetan Cultural Center

References

Citations

Sources

External links 
List of living buddha reincarnations

Gelug Buddhists
Tulkus